Talsukh is a rural locality (a selo) in Saniortinsky Selsoviet, Tlyaratinsky District, Republic of Dagestan, Russia. The population was 394 as of 2010.

Geography 
Talsukh is located 13 km southeast of Tlyarata (the district's administrative centre) by road. Rosnob is the nearest rural locality.

References 

Rural localities in Tlyaratinsky District